The women's 60 metres hurdles at the 2016 IAAF World Indoor Championships took place on March 18, 2016.

In the final, Angela Whyte had the best start, while Kendra Harrison led the American pack in the center of the track.  While Harrison was the first to the first hurdle, she hit it flat with her shoe, losing her balance and all momentum.  She was unable to clear the second hurdle in stride and was out of contention.  To her left Brianna Rollins was clean over the first hurdles while on her right Nia Ali hit the first and was half a meter behind.  Rollins' speed between the hurdles easily passed Whyte, while Ali gained a little ground aggressively snapping over each hurdle.  Coming off the last hurdle, Rollins lead was only inches, but Ali was able to make up just enough ground to out lean Rollins at the finish.  To Ali's right, Tiffany Porter came off the first hurdle even with Ali, but her taller, more upright running form lost a little ground as Ali was chasing Rollins.  Still Porter was clearly the next best of the field.

Results

Heats
Qualification: First 2 (Q) and next 2 fastest (q) qualified for the final.

Final
The final was started at 20:30.

References

60 metres hurdles
60 metres hurdles at the World Athletics Indoor Championships
2016 in women's athletics